The Last Separation, aka Vicki's New and Best, is a 2001 album by mainland Chinese pop singer Zhao Wei. The title song is based on her break-up with her boyfriend and was written by Taiwanese romance writer Chiung Yao.

Track listing

Disc One

Disc Two
Bonus Collection of 1999 albums.

References

2001 albums
Zhao Wei albums